King's Leadership Academy Warrington is a coeducational secondary school and sixth form based in Woolston area of Warrington, Cheshire, England.

The school opened in 2012 after the closure of Woolston High School but was set up independently as a free school by Sir Iain Hall and 'Great+ Schools' and not as a replacement from the local authority. The school won the National Character Award 2015 and was shortlisted in the Tes School Awards 2021 for the category of Secondary School of the Year Award in November 2020.

References

External links
 Kings Leadership Academy official website

Secondary schools in Warrington
Free schools in England
Educational institutions established in 2012
2012 establishments in England